Charles Millward (1830–1892) was an English musician, composer, actor, journal proprietor and monumental mason.

Biography
Charles Millward was a prolific composer of pantomimes and comic opera. He collaborated with W. S. Gilbert (1836–1911) on "Hush A Bye, Baby, on the Treetop; or, Harlequin Fortunia, King of Frog Island, and the Magic Top of Lowther Arcade" (1866).

Charles Millward was a member of the Savage Club and was father of English actress Jessie Millward (1861–1932).

He also had a successful monumental masonry business. He died in 1892 and was buried in Highgate Cemetery.

External links
National Portrait Gallery http://www.npg.org.uk/collections/search/person/mp93584/charles-millward

References

OCLC Worldcat Identities http://www.worldcat.org/identities/lccn-n83073715/
Watson, Aaron. "The Savage Club: a medley of history, anecdote, and reminiscence."London: T.F. Unwin, 1907. https://archive.org/details/savageclubmedley00watsuoft

People associated with Gilbert and Sullivan
1830 births
1892 deaths
Burials at Highgate Cemetery
19th-century British composers